Clapton is the eighteenth solo studio album by English rock guitarist and singer-songwriter Eric Clapton. It was released on 27 September 2010 in the United Kingdom and the following day in the United States.

Background
The album was Clapton's first studio album in four years following his duet with J.J. Cale in The Road to Escondido (2006), and is made up of a mix of new material and cover songs. Clapton has played tracks off this album such as "Rocking Chair" and "When Somebody Thinks You're Wonderful" live on tour. Clapton has said, "This album wasn’t what it was intended to be at all. It's actually better than it was meant to be because, in a way, I just let it happen."

Chart performance
Clapton debuted at number seven on the UK Albums Chart, his highest charting album on the chart since Reptile from 2001. In the United States it entered the Billboard 200 at number six, selling 47,000 copies in its first week on the chart. The album reached top five positions in Austria, Denmark, Germany, Norway, Spain, Sweden and Switzerland.

Critical reception

According to review aggregator Metacritic, Clapton received an average of 72 out of 100 indicating generally favourable reviews from music critics, based on ten critiques. In his review of Clapton for Allmusic, Stephen Thomas Erlewine said that "there's no record quite like Clapton in Eric Clapton's catalog," and goes on to say that the album "flows easy, the blues never hitting too hard, the New Orleans jazz never getting too woozy, the standards never too sleepy, the sounds subtly shifting but changing all the same." In David Fricke's review for rollingstone.com he called Clapton, "a serenely masterful engagement with roots – the guitarist co-wrote just one original – that is all over the place in repertoire yet devoutly grounded in its roaming. Irving Berlin's "How Deep Is the Ocean" comes with an earnest, sandy Clapton vocal and lighthouse beams of trumpet by Wynton Marsalis. Little Walter's "Can't Hold Out Much Longer" has the crusty flair of Clapton's 1965 and '66 recordings with John Mayall. A pair of Fats Waller romps are decked out in New Orleans brass and pianos, one of them played by Allen Toussaint."

Grammy Awards
The track "Run Back to Your Side" was nominated for Best Solo Rock Vocal Performance at the 53rd Annual Grammy Awards, held on 13 February 2011.

Track listing
 "Travelin' Alone" (Lil' Son Jackson) – 3:56
 "Rocking Chair" (Hoagy Carmichael) – 4:04
 "River Runs Deep" (J.J. Cale) – 5:52
 "Judgement Day" (Snooky Pryor) – 3:13
 "How Deep Is the Ocean" (Irving Berlin) – 5:29
 "My Very Good Friend the Milkman" (Lyrics: Johnny Burke, Music: Harold Spina) – 3:20
 "Can't Hold Out Much Longer" (Walter Jacobs) – 4:08
 "That's No Way to Get Along" (Robert Wilkins) – 6:07
 "Everything Will Be Alright" (J.J. Cale) – 3:51
 "Diamonds Made from Rain" (Doyle Bramhall II, Nikka Costa, Justin Stanley) – 4:22
 "When Somebody Thinks You're Wonderful" (Harry M. Woods) – 2:51
 "Hard Times Blues" (Lane Hardin) – 3:45
 "Run Back to Your Side" (Bramhall, Eric Clapton) – 5:17
 "Autumn Leaves" (Joseph Kosma, Johnny Mercer, Jacques Prévert) – 5:40

ericclapton.com Deluxe Limited Edition bonus track
  "You Better Watch Yourself"
Barnes & Noble and Best Buy bonus track
  "Take a Little Walk with Me"
iTunes bonus track
  "I Was Fooled"
Amazon.com bonus track
  "Midnight Hour Blues"

Personnel 
Performers
 Eric Clapton – vocals, guitar, mandolin (12)
 Doyle Bramhall II – guitar (1, 4, 7, 10, 12, 13, 15), vocal arrangement (4), hi-hat (7), guitar solo (8, 12), percussion (8), vocals (10)
 Derek Trucks – slide guitar (2), guitar (3)
 J. J. Cale – guitar (3, 8), vocals (3, 8, 9)
 Greg Leisz – pedal steel guitar (3)
 Walt Richmond – Hammond organ (1), acoustic piano (2, 4-15), Wurlitzer electric piano (3), keyboards (14)
 James Poyser – Hammond organ (3, 8)
 Allen Toussaint – acoustic piano (6, 11)
 Steve Riley – accordion (8)
 Paul Carrack – Hammond organ (9)
 Sereca Henderson – organ (10)
 Willie Weeks – bass guitar (1, 4, 8, 9, 10, 13), double bass (2, 3, 5, 7, 12, 14, 15)
 Chris Severan – double bass (6, 11)
 Jim Keltner – drums (1, 4, 5, 7, 8, 10, 12, 13), percussion (1, 8, 12, 13)
 Abe Laboriel Jr. – drums (2, 14)
 Jeremy Stacey – drums (3, 10)
 Justin Stanley – drums (3), additional percussion (8), horn arrangements (10)
 Herman Labeaux – drums (6, 11)
 Cayetano "Tanio" Hingle – bass drum (6, 11), cymbal (6, 11), clarinet (8)
 Jason Moeller – drums (15)
 David Guy – horn arrangements (3)
 Neal Sugarman – tenor saxophone (3)
 Leon Michaels – trumpet (3)
 Thomas Brenneck – horns (3)
 Kim Wilson – harmonica (4, 7, 15)
 Wynton Marsalis – trumpet (5, 6, 11)
 Troy Andrews – trombone (6, 11), trumpet (6, 11), bass drum (8)
 Matt Pyreem – tuba (6, 11)
 Michael White – clarinet (6, 11)
 Clarenee Slaughter – baritone saxophone (8)
 Bruce Brackman – sousaphone (8)
 Edward Lee – tenor saxophone (8)
 Tim Callagan – trombone (8), trumpet (8)
 Dan Ostreicher – horns (8)
 Sherrell Chenier Mouton – washboard (8)
 Tim Izo Orindgreff – saxophone (9, 10)
 Elizabeth Lea – trombone (9, 10)
 Printz Board – trumpet (9, 10)
 Nick Ingman – string arrangements (1-9, 11-14), conductor
 Patrick Warren – string arrangements (10)
 The London Session Orchestra – strings (3, 5, 9, 10, 14)
 Perry Montague-Mason – concertmaster
 Nikka Costa – backing vocals (2, 10, 13)
 Terry Evans – backing vocals (4, 8)
 Willie Green, Jr. – backing vocals (4, 8)
 Arnold McCuller – backing vocals (4, 8)
 Lynn Mabry – backing vocals (10, 13)
 Debra Parsons – backing vocals (10, 13)
 Sheryl Crow – vocals (10)
Arnold Kłymkiw - vocals (15)

Production
 Producers – Eric Clapton, Doyle Bramhall II , Justin Stanley (Track #10).
 Engineer and Mixed by Justin Stanley
 Recorded at Ocean Way Recording (Hollywood, CA) and Piety Street Recording  (New Orleans, LA).
 Mastering – Gavin Lurssen at Lurssen Mastering (Hollywood, CA).
 Photography – Doyle Bramhall II (recording studio), Nigel Carroll (recording studio), Terry O'Neill (front and back), Gregory Malphurs (guitars).

 Design – Stephen Walker
 Production Coordinator – Debbie Johnson

Chart positions

Weekly charts

Year-end charts

Certifications

References

External links
 Album preview at ericclapton.com
 Clapton at Metacritic

2010 albums
Covers albums
Eric Clapton albums
Reprise Records albums